is a Japanese politician of the Democratic Party of Japan, a member of the House of Councillors in the Diet (national legislature). A native of Tokushima, Tokushima, he graduated from University of Tokushima in 1992 and received a master's degree from it in 1994. He was elected to the House of Councillors for the first time in 2007.

References

External links 
 Official website in Japanese.

Members of the House of Councillors (Japan)
Living people
1968 births
Democratic Party of Japan politicians
People from Tokushima (city)